Cheshire Hall is a football club of Turks and Caicos. They play in the Turks and Caicos first division, the WIV Provo Premier League.

Achievements
WIV Provo Premier League: 2
2012, 2013.

Players

References

Football clubs in the Turks and Caicos Islands
1999 establishments in the Turks and Caicos Islands
Association football clubs established in 1999